The imperial election of 1440 was an imperial election held to select the emperor of the Holy Roman Empire.  It took place in Frankfurt on February 2.

Background 
Albert II of Germany, King-elect of Germany, died on October 27, 1439.  The prince-electors convened to replace him were:

 Dietrich Schenk von Erbach, elector of Mainz
 James of Sierk, elector of Trier
 Dietrich II of Moers, elector of Cologne
 Louis IV, Elector Palatine, elector of the Electoral Palatinate
 Frederick II, Elector of Saxony, elector of Saxony
 Frederick I, Elector of Brandenburg, elector of Brandenburg

The throne of Bohemia was vacant.  Albert was king of Bohemia and his firstborn son Ladislaus the Posthumous would not be born until February 22.

Elected 
Frederick III, Holy Roman Emperor, duke of Styria, Carinthia and Carniola and regent of Austria, was elected.

Aftermath 
Frederick III was crowned in Rome by the pope on March 19, 1452.  He was the lineal ancestor of all subsequent emperors of the House of Habsburg.

1440
1440 in the Holy Roman Empire
15th-century elections
Non-partisan elections
Frederick III, Holy Roman Emperor